Delphine Wespiser (born 3 January 1992) is a French model, television presenter and politician. She is a beauty pageant titleholder who was elected Miss Haut-Rhin 2011, Miss Alsace 2011 and Miss France 2012.

Biography 
Delphine Wespiser is from Magstatt-le-Bas, located in the department of Haut-Rhin. She is the daughter of an architect father and a laboratory technician mother and has an older brother. She spent her entire childhood and did her schooling in the region of Alsace. In 2010, she passed her high school final exams in economics and social studies. She then studied International Business Management joining the IUT of Colmar.

She was elected Miss Alsace 2011 in Kingersheim, Haut-Rhin on 2 October 2011. Two months later, she was elected Miss France 2012 in Brest.

Delphine is the spokesperson of many charitable organizations like "Caravane de la vie" for blood donation. She also defends animal rights with the International Fund for Animal Welfare, and is a vegetarian. Because of these beliefs, she also had interest in becoming a veterinarian.

In addition to French, she is fluent in English and German. She also speaks Alsatian and promotes the use of regional languages.

Miss France 2012

Election 
Delphine Wespiser was crowned Miss France 2012 on 3 December 2011 in Brest, succeeding Miss France 2011 Laury Thilleman, obtaining 32.3% from the votes of the audience.

Her runner-ups are :
 1st runner-up : Miss Pays de Loire, Mathilde Couly ;
 2nd runner-up : Miss Réunion, Marie Payet ; Miss Universe France 2012 ;
 3rd runner-up : Miss Provence, Solène Froment ;
 4th runner-up : Miss Côte d'Azur, Charlotte Murray ;
 5th runner-up : Miss Martinique, Charlène Civault ;
 6th runner-up : Miss Languedoc, Alison Cossenet.

Miss World 

On 18 August 2012, Delphine Wespiser represented France during the Miss World 2012 election in Ordos City in the region of Inner Mongolia in China, where she failed to reach the semi-final. Her second runner-up Marie Payet participated at the Miss Universe 2012 title on 19 December 2012 in Las Vegas.

Miss France year 
On 28 January 2012, she gave an award at the thirteenth ceremony of the NRJ Music Awards, broadcast live on TF1 at the Midem of Cannes. During that year, Delphine Wespiser met Miss Switzerland 2011 Alina Buchschacher, Miss Ukraine 2012, and Oleysia Stefanko, first runner-up of Miss Universe 2011, as well as other personalities.

She then participated at a special Miss France episode of the game show Fort Boyard, filmed at night and broadcast for Halloween 2012 with former Miss France Sylvie Tellier, Corinne Coman, Lætitia Bléger, Laury Thilleman and journalist Christophe Beaugrand for the International Fund for Animal Welfare. She also participated at the program Un dîner presque parfait (French version of Come Dine with Me) on M6 on the week from Monday 19 to Friday 23 November 2012 in Mulhouse. The program was broadcast again in December 2016 on W9.

Career after Miss France

Television 
After participating as a candidate in Fort Boyard on 31 October 2012 on France 2 during her Miss France year, she became one of the characters of the game show since summer 2013. She has been playing the role of the judge Blanche and since June 2015, she also plays her twin sister Rouge.

She participated at the game show N'oubliez pas les paroles! on France 2 in January 2013. She played with Thomas Hughes and another anonymous contestant for the association Emmaüs Solidarité, and later in January 2015 with Dany Brillant. She also played several times at the game show Mot de passe (French version of Million Dollar Password) on France 2.

From Monday 10 to Friday 14 April 2017, she participated again in Un Dîner presque parfait in Strasbourg and broadcast on W9. Television presenter Jérôme Anthony is part of the contestants.

Politics 
In 2014, she was candidate at the municipal elections in Magstatt-le-Bas on the list of the independent outgoing Mayor. She was elected at the first round on 23 March 2014, when the list garnered 51.55% of the votes. She is part of a team of eleven advisors of her town.

Beauty pageants 
 Miss Haut-Rhin 2011, elected on 26 March 2011 in Lutterbach.
 Miss Alsace 2011, elected on 2 October 2011 in Kingersheim.
 Miss France 2012, elected on 3 December 2011 in Brest.
 Unranked at Miss World 2012, on 18 August 2012 in Ordos City, China.

References

External links 

1992 births
Living people
Politicians from Mulhouse
Miss France winners
Miss World 2012 delegates
Alsatian people
Beauty queen-politicians
Mass media people from Mulhouse
French anti-vaccination activists